Bummer or Bummers may refer to:

 Bummer (album), an album by Cleopatrick
 Bummers, nickname of American Civil War foragers of William Tecumseh Sherman's army during its March to the Sea and beyond
 Aaron Bummer (born 1993), American Major League Baseball pitcher
 nickname of Hugh Stirling (1907–1994), Canadian football player
 Bummer and Lazarus, two stray dogs that roamed the streets of San Francisco, California, United States, in the early 1860s
 "Bummer" (song), by American rock band Sparks
 Bummer (band), American noise rock band